Dallas was a town in Ouray County, Colorado, United States.  It lay about 3 miles (5 km) north of the present town of Ridgway at the confluence of Dallas Creek and the Uncompahgre River. A community named in tribute to the historic town bearing the name Dallas Meadows now exists at its historic location.

History
Dallas was founded in 1880 and named after the former Vice President of the United States, George M. Dallas, and was a stagecoach stop on a toll road which linked Montrose with Ouray.  The Denver & Rio Grande Railroad reached Dallas in 1887 and Dallas was incorporated on 2 April 1889. The new town of Ridgway was founded a year later in 1890 and became the prominent town as Dallas slowly disappeared.

See also
Communities of Ouray County

External links

Ghost towns in Colorado
Former populated places in Ouray County, Colorado